The Mississippi Association of Community Colleges Conference (MACCC), formerly known as the Mississippi Association of Community and Junior Colleges (MACJC) is one of the two conferences that make up Region XXIII (or Region 23) of the National Junior College Athletic Association (NJCAA) along with the LCCAC. Its football league began play in 1927.

The East Mississippi Community College football team was featured on the first and second seasons of the television documentary "Last Chance U" and consequently multiple games of the conference were featured on the documentary.

MACCC Members

Northern division
Coahoma Community College
East Mississippi Community College
Holmes Community College
Itawamba Community College
Mississippi Delta Community College
Northeast Mississippi Community College
Northwest Mississippi Community College
Southern division
Copiah-Lincoln Community College
East Central Community College
Hinds Community College
Jones College
Mississippi Gulf Coast Community College
Pearl River Community College
Southwest Mississippi Community College
Meridian Community College

Former members
Clarke (absorbed into Mississippi College)

Conference Football Champions
In order of total titles won.

Pearl River (19 titles, 15 outright): 2006, 2005, 2004*, 2003, 1976, 1970, 1969, 1963, 1961, 1960+, 1959, 1956, 1953+, 1952+, 1949, 1928+, 1927, 1926, 1925
Mississippi Gulf Coast (aka Perkinston) (16 titles, 13 outright): 2019*, 2010, 2008, 2007+* (co-nat'l championship with Butler), 1986, 1984*, 1982+, 1980, 1974, 1971*, 1967, 1966, 1948, 1942, 1936, 1927+
Jones County (13 titles, 12 outright): 2001, 1998, 1983, 1979, 1978, 1968, 1964, 1955, 1951, 1947, 1946+, 1941, 1940
Hinds (13 titles, 9 outright): 2000, 1997, 1996, 1995, 1994, 1988, 1957, 1954, 1953+, 1952+, 1946+, 1945+, 1944*
Holmes (5 titles, 4 outright): 2002, 1981, 1950, 1945+, 1935
Copiah-Lincoln (10 titles, 10 outright): 2012, 1985, 1938, 1937, 1934, 1933, 1932, 1931, 1930, 1929
Northwest Mississippi (8 titles, 6 outright): 2015*, 1999, 1992*, 1991, 1989, 1987, 1982+, 1965, 1960+
Mississippi Delta (aka Sunflower) (5 titles, 4 outright): 1993*, 1973, 1972, 1962, 1928+
East Mississippi (6 titles, 6 outright): 2018, 2017, 2016, 2014*, 2013*, 2011*, 2009
Itawamba (3 titles, 3 outright): 1990, 1977, 1975
East Central (2 title, 1 outright): 2016, 1939
Southwest Mississippi (1 title, 1 outright): 1958
Clarke (1 title, 0 outright): 1928+

.
"+" denotes shared title.

MACCC teams winners of the NJCAA National Football Championship
2019   Mississippi Gulf Coast Community College
2018   East Mississippi Community College
2017   East Mississippi Community College
2015   Northwest Mississippi Community College
2014   East Mississippi Community College
2013   East Mississippi Community College
2011   East Mississippi Community College
2007   Mississippi Gulf Coast Community College (co-champions with Butler Community College)
2004 	Pearl River Community College
1993 	Mississippi Delta Community College
1992 	Northwest Mississippi Community College
1984 	Mississippi Gulf Coast Community College
1982 	Northwest Mississippi Community College
1971 	Mississippi Gulf Coast Community College

See also
National Junior College Athletic Association (NJCAA)
NJCAA Region 23
Louisiana Community Colleges Athletic Conference, also in NJCAA Region 23
List of community college football programs
Last Chance U

References

External links
MACCC official website
MACJC Handbook (9/13/07)
NJCAA Website

NJCAA conferences
College sports in Mississippi